The Husbands of Leontine (French: Les maris de Léontine) is a 1947 French comedy film directed by René Le Hénaff and starring Jacqueline Gauthier, Pierre Jourdan and Gil Roland.

The film's sets were designed by the art director Raymond Nègre. The film is based on a play by Alfred Capus which had previously been made as a 1928 German silent film Leontine's Husbands.

Cast

References

Bibliography 
 Rège, Philippe. Encyclopedia of French Film Directors, Volume 1. Scarecrow Press, 2009.

External links 
 

1947 films
1947 comedy films
French comedy films
1940s French-language films
Films directed by René Le Hénaff
French films based on plays
French black-and-white films
1940s French films